Speak n Spell Music (or Speak n Spell Music Publishing Pty Ltd) was an Australia and New Zealand based Record Label, Artist Management, International Touring Company and music licensing company. The record label was based in Collingwood, it was founded by Jonathan Wilson, David Shrimpton and David Benge. It released over 120 titles that were distributed via Inertia and Universal. Some artists released on Speak n Spell included Editors, Midlake, School of Seven Bells, Warpaint and Dappled Cities. The management company looked after four acts signed to both independent and major labels locally and internationally in the UK, Europe and the USA. The Management roster included Cut Off Your Hands (NZ), Violent Soho, Jack Ladder (AMP Winner 2008), Kid Sam (2009 J Award nominee), Ghoul and producer Scott Horscroft. Speak and Spell Music was conceived and established in 2004 and closed in April 2011.

References

Companies established in 2004
Companies disestablished in 2011
Australian record labels
New Zealand record labels
Record labels based in Melbourne